Sohlberg is a surname. Notable people with the surname include:

Harald Sohlberg (1869–1935), Norwegian painter
Kristian Sohlberg (born 1978), Finnish rally driver
Tutu Sohlberg (born 1941), Finnish equestrian
Ernst Bertil Sohlberg (1891-1969) Finnish Diplomat
Noam Sohlberg (born 1962) Israeli Judge